The 1993 President's Cup International Football Tournament was the 20th competition of Korea Cup. It was held from 19 to 28 June 1993, and was won by Egypt for the first time.

Group stage

Group A

Group B

Knockout stage

Bracket

Semi-finals

Final

See also
Korea Cup
South Korea national football team results

References

External links
President's Cup 1993 (South Korea) at RSSSF

1993